Friedrich Schulze, Friedrich Schulze-Colbitz or Friedrich Schulze-Kolbitz (8 or 18 March 1843 in Colbitz – 30 July 1912 in Steglitz near Berlin; full name: Johann David Friedrich Otto Schulze) was a German architect and Prussian master of works.

1843 births
1912 deaths
People from Börde (district)
People from the Province of Saxony
19th-century German architects